Lalsavunga Park is a tourist spot near Aizawl, Mizoram. It is about 18 km from Aizawl in South Hlimen. It is at an elevation of 1179 metres.

History

Lalsavunga Park construction started in 2014 with an estimated expenditure of 464 lakhs. The area of the park is 120 acres and the mountain range is 1 km long. The park was opened on 3 October 2018.

Facilities 

 Children Park 
 Swing Bridges
 Cross Mount
 Hall
 Restaurant
 Cottages

See also
Phawngpui National Park
List of national parks of India

References

External links

Tourist attractions in Mizoram
Tourism in Mizoram
Hills of Mizoram